Anton Kugler (28 March 1898 – 2 June 1962) was a German international footballer.

References

1898 births
1962 deaths
Association football defenders
German footballers
Germany international footballers
1. FC Nürnberg players